Identity Crisis is the debut album by pop group Clea. Identity Crisis was released in Russia, Eastern Europe and in certain countries in Asia. In these regions, the album had some minor success. The album spawned two singles, "Download It" and "Stuck in the Middle", achieving low chart positions.

Track listing

2004 debut albums